San or SAN may refer to:

Places
 San (river), in Poland and Ukraine
 San, Burkina Faso, Pompoï Department, Balé Province
 San, Mali, Ségou Region
 San, Wiang Sa, a subdistrict of Wiang Sa District, Nan, Thailand
 Sanitarium (healthcare), sometimes nicknamed San 
 Sydney Adventist Hospital, Australia
 Battle Creek Sanitarium, in Michigan, US

Arts
 San (band), Yugoslav rock band
 San (album) by Japanese band and Mighty Color
 The Dream (1966 film), San in Serbian, a 1966 Yugoslav film
 Umbrella (film), or San, China, 2007
 San, the protagonist of the 1997 film Princess Mononoke

Computing
 Storage area network
 System area network, linking clusters of computers
 Subject Alternative Name associated with a security certificate

Transport
 San, buses by Polish manufacturer Autosan
 SAN Ecuador (Servicios Aéreos Nacionales, ICAO code: SAN), a defunct airline
 SAN, the AAR reporting mark for the Sandersville Railroad in the US
 SAN, the IATA code San Diego International Airport in California, US
 SAN, the National Rail code for Sandown railway station on the Isle of Wight, UK
 Société Aéronautique Normande, a defunct French aircraft manufacturer

Organisations
 South African Navy
 Stigma Action Network, about HIV stigma

Languages
 Spanish and Italian for "Saint"
 San (letter), an archaic Greek letter (Ϻ or Ϡ), between pi and qoppa
 San (Japanese honorific) suffix (-san), equivalent to Mr., Mrs. or Miss

Other uses
 Sinoatrial node
 San people, indigenous people of southern Africa
 Standard algebraic notation, in chess
 Senior Advocate of Nigeria, a rank
 Styrene-acrylonitrile resin, a copolymer plastic

See also
 Sans (disambiguation)